Norantea is a genus of flowering plants belonging to the family Marcgraviaceae.

Its native range is the Southern Caribbean to Southern Tropical America.

Species
Species:
 Norantea brasiliensis Choisy 
 Norantea guianensis Aubl.

References

Marcgraviaceae
Ericales genera